Oyo Igboho is a large town  in Oyo State, Nigeria. It is the headquarters of the Orelope Local Government Area. It has an estimated population of 200,000.

The town has a post office and a radio station.

History 
Igboho was founded by Alaafin Eguguojo as the capital of the Oyo Empire in the 16th century while the Oyo had been driven from their previous capital of Oyo-Ile by their Nupe enemies. It had strong natural defenses and was surrounded by triple walls, allowing the Oyo to resist the Nupe. It remained the Oyo capital for Eguguojo's successors until Oyo-Ile was reoccupied by Abipa. Òyó Igboho is hosted four Alaafins and they are buried in Igbo Oba beside First Baptist Church, Obaago, the Igbo Oba is monitored and supervised by the Aare of Igboho. Igboho as very peaceful and loving. There are various quarters in Igboho which includes Oke-gboho (The seat of power of Igboho people) which host the Palace of Onigboho of Igboho Land, Obaago (Alepata), Modeeke (Ònà Onibode), Booni-Iba booni, Iyeye-Baale, Ago-IgiIsubu, Jakuta, Waala, Idi elegba, Akitipa among others are also some of the quarters in Igboho. The town has a town hall situated in Owode,a Radio Station brought by Emeritus Professor Dibu Ojerinde at Owode too as well, First Central Mosque in the town is at Modeeke while the First ever Church is First Baptist Church, Obaago, Igboho (Est. 1922) with Rev. Dr. S A. Adediran as the Pastor. 
Igboho is well represented both home and abroad with the First Nigerian Professor of tests and measurements coming from the town, Professor Dibu Ojerinde.

Geography and economy
Igboho lies in fertile country of wooded savanna. It spreads over an extensive area, being surrounded by mud walls for protection from wars in those days. yams, cassava, maize, other fruits, and shea butter are the chief articles of trade. It is a key export location for tobacco, fruits, and kola nuts.

Igboho is about 405m-445m above sea level, home to several shrines. The town depends on the Dam in Akitipa for its water supply, which is not always dependable. The dam is situated in the Oorelope local government area of Oyo State in the West of Nigeria, about 162  km northwest of the state capital Ibadan.

Home to various farm products. Known for its yam production and maize in large quantities. Igboho is the food basket of Oyo state and Owode market (which opens every 5 days) is the largest yarm market in southwest Nigeria with people bringing yarm and other farm produce from far and near.

Religion
Igboho, like many other Yoruba towns and cities, is inhabited by Christians, Muslims, and the adherents of African Traditional Religious belief.

Education
The first school, Baptist Central (primary) school, was established by the missionary in the year 1940, and the first secondary school, Irepo Grammar school was established in the 1960s to serve the people of Igboho, Kisi, and Igbeti at the time. Today, Igboho is home to several primary, secondary, and post-secondary schools. Other public secondary schools include;
1. Igboho More Community Secondary School, Idi-Elegba.
2. Ifelodun Grammar School, Oke-Loko.
3. Baptist High School, Owode.

Transportation
Igboho connects Ilorin by road through Igbope, It also connects to Igbeti Kishi, Ogbooro, Sepeteri and Baruten Kwara State.

Notable natives and residents
 Dibu Ojerinde, First Professor of Tests and Measurements in Nigeria and Africa as well as Former CEO, NECO, and JAMB
 Sunday Igboho Yoruba right activist

References

Populated places in Oyo State